JEC may refer to: 

 Jabalpur Engineering College, located in Madhya Pradesh, India
 Jaipur Engineering College, located in Jaipur, Rajasthan
 James E. Cornette, a stage name for American professional wrestling manager Jim Cornette 
 James Earl Carter (born 1924), 39th president of the United States
 Jardine Engineering Corporation (JEC), an engineering corporation in Hong Kong, a member of Jardine Matheson Group
 Jersey Electricity Company, in Jersey, Channel Islands
 Jeunesse Etudiante Chrétienne, a worldwide group of young Christian students
 Jewish Educational Center, in New Jersey
 João Emanuel Carneiro, a popular Brazilian screenwriter and film director 
 Joinville Esporte Clube, football club in Brazil
 Jonsson Engineering Center, in New York State
 Jorhat Engineering College, in India
 Junta Electoral Central, the Spanish election overseer